Stroc is a village in the municipality of Vučitrn, Kosovo. It is the site of the Stroc Castle.

Population 

In the census of 2011, there were 865 inhabitants in Stroc.

Notes

References

Villages in Vushtrri